The FireKeepers Casino Hotel Championship is a tournament on the Epson Tour, the LPGA's developmental tour. It has been a part of the tour's schedule since 2014. 

It is held at Battle Creek Golf Club in Battle Creek, Michigan, designed by Scottish golf course architect Willie Park Jr. in 1919.

Title sponsor is the FireKeepers Casino Hotel, owned and operated by the local Nottawaseppi Huron Band of Potawatomi.

Winners

References

External links

Coverage on Epson Tour website

Symetra Tour events
Golf in Michigan
Recurring sporting events established in 2014
2014 establishments in Michigan